Kellswater railway station served the hamlet of Kellswater in County Antrim, Northern Ireland.

History

The station was opened by the Belfast and Northern Counties Railway on 1 June 1876.

The station, at which trains rarely called, closed to passengers on 15 March 1971.

References 

Disused railway stations in County Antrim
Railway stations opened in 1876
Railway stations closed in 1971
Railway stations in Northern Ireland opened in the 19th century